WWCG-LP (Channel 11) was a low power television station in Columbus, Georgia, known as Columbus 11. WWCG-LP was owned by MD Broadcasting.

The station was previously affiliated with White Springs Television, which aired primarily public domain and made for TV movies from the 1960s, 1970s and 1980s. WSTV would fold in late 2009.

The station would close down by August 2009, as the channel 11 frequency was assigned to WTVM for digital broadcasting. WWCG was issued a construction permit for digital broadcast on channel 28, the former frequency of WJSP-TV; however, the station never resumed broadcast, resulting in the permit's cancellation on May 2, 2011.

External links
 FCC data for DWWCG-LP

Defunct television stations in the United States
Television channels and stations established in 2008
Television channels and stations disestablished in 2009
WCG-LP
2008 establishments in Georgia (U.S. state)
2009 disestablishments in Georgia (U.S. state)